Saganami may refer to:

 Edward Saganami, a character in David Weber's Honorverse.
 The Shadow of Saganami, a spin-off novel set in the Honorverse.
 Saganami Island Tactical Simulator, a Honorverse-based tabletop wargame.